Kang Hye-ja (born 4 July 1966) is a South Korean sport shooter. She was born in Jeju Province. She won a gold medal in the women's 10 metre air rifle team event in shooting at the 1986 Asian Games along with teammates Lee Hong-ki (이홍기; 李弘基) and Park Jeong-ah (박정아; 朴貞娥). She later competed in the 1988 Summer Olympics.

References

1966 births
Living people
South Korean female sport shooters
ISSF rifle shooters
Olympic shooters of South Korea
Shooters at the 1988 Summer Olympics
Shooters at the 1986 Asian Games
Asian Games medalists in shooting
Sportspeople from Jeju Province
Asian Games gold medalists for South Korea
Medalists at the 1986 Asian Games
20th-century South Korean women
21st-century South Korean women